This page lists public opinion polls conducted for the 2021 French regional elections, which were held in two rounds on 20 and 27 June 2021.

Unless otherwise noted, all polls listed below are compliant with the regulations of the national polling commission (Commission nationale des sondages) and utilize the quota method.

National

First round

Auvergne-Rhône-Alpes

First round

Second round

Bourgogne-Franche-Comté

First round

Second round

Brittany

First round

Second round

Centre-Val de Loire

First round

Second round

Corsica

First round

Grand Est

First round

Second round

Hauts-de-France

First round

Second round

Île-de-France

First round

Second round

Normandy

First round

Second round

Nouvelle-Aquitaine

First round

Second round

Occitanie

First round

Second round

Pays de la Loire

First round

Second round

Provence-Alpes-Côte d'Azur

First round

Second round

Reunion

First round

References

External links
Results of past regional elections from the Ministry of the Interior 

2021
2021 elections in France